The battles listed here are ones that have corresponding Wikipedia articles. A flag icon to the left of a battle's name shows the victorious side in the engagement. The date to the right of a battle's name shows when it began, except in the case of 1942's Battle of Changsha, which began in December 1941.

Campaigns
 Honan-Hupeh Campaign
 Western Hunan Campaign

 Japanese Campaigns in Chinese War

Aerial engagements
 Aerial Engagements of the Second Sino-Japanese War

Battles with articles.  Flag shows victorious side in each engagement.  Date shows beginning date except for the 1942 battle of Changsha, which began in Dec. 1941.

Battles
  Mukden September 1931
  Invasion of Manchuria September 1931
  Jiangqiao Campaign October 1931
  Resistance at Nenjiang Bridge November 1931
  Jinzhou December 1931
  Defense of Harbin January 1932
   Shanghai January 1932
  Pacification of Manchukuo March 1932
  Defense of the Great Wall January 1933
  Battle of Rehe February 1933
 Actions in Inner Mongolia (1933–1936)
  Suiyuan Campaign October 1936
 Battle of Lugou Bridge July 1937
  Battle of Beiping–Tianjin July 1937
  Chahar August 1937
   Battle of Shanghai August 1937
  Defense of Sihang Warehouse October 26, 1937
  Beiping–Hankou August 1937
  Tianjin–Pukou August 1937
  Battle of Taiyuan September 1937
  Battle of Pingxingguan September 1937
  Battle of Xinkou September 1937
  Battle of Nanking December 1937
  Battle of Xuzhou December 1937
  Battle of Taierzhuang March 1938
  Northern and Eastern Honan 1938 January 1938
  Battle of Lanfeng May 1938
  Xiamen May 1938
  Battle of Wuhan June 1938
  Battle of Wanjialing
  Guangdong October 1938
  Hainan Island February 1939
  Battle of Nanchang March 1939
  Battle of Xiushui River March 1939
  Battle of Suixian–Zaoyang May 1939
   Shantou June 1939
  Battle of Changsha (1939) September 1939
  Battle of South Guangxi November 1939
  Battle of Kunlun Pass December 1939
  1939–1940 Winter Offensive November 1939
  Battle of West Suiyuan January – February 1940
  Battle of Wuyuan March 1940
  Battle of Zaoyang–Yichang May 1940
  Hundred Regiments Offensive August 1940
  Central Hupei November 1940
  Battle of South Henan January 1941
  Western Hopei March 1941
  Battle of Shanggao March 1941
  Battle of South Shanxi May 1941
  Battle of Changsha (1941) September 1941
  Battle of Changsha (1942) January 1942
  Battle of Yunnan-Burma Road March 1942
  Battle of Toungoo
   Battle of Yenangyaung
  Battle of Zhejiang-Jiangxi April 1942
  Battle of West Hubei May 1943
   Battle of Northern Burma and Western Yunnan October 1943
  Battle of Changde November 1943
  Operation Ichi-Go
  Operation Kogo Battle of Central Henan April 1944
  Operation Togo 1 Battle of Changsha (1944)
  Operation Togo 2 and Operation Togo 3 Battle of Guilin–Liuzhou August 1944
  Battle of West Henan–North Hubei March — May 1945
   Battle of West Hunan April – June 1945
  Second Guangxi Campaign April — July 1945

1931
  Mukden September 1931
  Invasion of Manchuria September 1931
  Jiangqiao Campaign October 1931
  Resistance at Nenjiang Bridge  November 1931
  Chinchow Operation December 1931

1932
  Defense of Harbin January 1932
  Shanghai (1932) January 1932
  Pacification of Manchukuo March 1932 - 1941
  Manchukuoan Anti Bandit Operations March 1932 - 1934
  Northeast Anti-Japanese United Army Resistance 1934 - 1941

1933-1936
  Operation Nekka January 1933
  Great Wall January 1933
  Battle of Rehe February 1933
 Actions in Inner Mongolia (1933-36)
  Campaign of the Anti-Japanese Allied Army May - October 1933
  Establishment of Mengjiang December 1935 - May 1936
  Suiyuan Campaign October 1936

1937
 Marco Polo Bridge Incident July 1937
  Beiping-Tianjin July 1937
  Chahar August 1937
  Battle of Shanghai August 1937
  Beiping–Hankou Railway Operation August 1937
  Tianjin–Pukou Railway Operation August 1937
  Taiyuan September 1937
  Battle of Pingxingguan September 1937
  Battle of Xinkou September 1937
  Battle of Nanjing December 1937

1938
  Battle of Xuzhou March 24 - May 1, 1938
  Battle of Taierzhuang 4 March – 7 April 1938
  Northern and Eastern Honan 1938 January 1938
  Battle of Lanfeng May 1938
  Amoy Operation May 1938
  Battle of Wuhan 11 June – 27 October 1938
  Canton Operation  October 1938

1939
  Hainan Island Operation February 1939
  Battle of Nanchang March 1939
  Battle of Xiushui River March 1939
  Battle of Suixian-Zaoyang May 1939
   Swatow Operation June 1939
  Battle of Changsha (1939) September 1939
  Battle of South Guangxi November 1939
  Battle of Kunlun Pass December 1939
  1939-40 Winter Offensive November 1939 - March 1940
  Battle of Wuyuan March 1940

1940
  Battle of Zaoyang-Yichang May 1940
  Hundred Regiments Offensive August 1940
  Indochina Expedition September 1940
  Central Hopei Operation November 1940

1941
  Battle of South Henan January 1941
  Western Hopei Operation March 1941
  Battle of Shanggao March 1941
  Battle of South Shanxi May 1941
  Battle of Changsha (1941) September 1941

1942
  Battle of Changsha (1942) January 1942
  Battle of Yunnan-Burma Road March – June 1942
  Battle of Toungoo March 19-March 29, 1942
  Battle of Yenangyaung April 11–19, 1942
  Battle of Zhejiang-Jiangxi April 1942

1943
  Battle of West Hubei 12 May - 3 June 1943
  Battle of Northern Burma and Western Yunnan October 1943 – March 1945
  Battle of Changde 2 November – 20 December 1943

1944
  Operation Ichi-Go.19 April – 31 December 1944
  Battle of Changsha (1944) May 1944 - August 1944
  Defense of Hengyang 22 June – 8 August 1944 (Japan Pyrrhic victory. Tojo cabinet collapsed.)
  Battle of Guilin–Liuzhou 16 August - 24 November 1944
 Battle of Mount Song June 4, 1944 – September 7, 1944

1945
  Battle of West Henan-North Hubei 21 March – 11 May 1945 (Tactical stalemate, Japanese operational victory)
  Battle of West Hunan April - June, 1945
  Second Guangxi Campaign April - August 1945
  Soviet invasion of Manchuria August – September, 1945

Japanese invasions and operations
 Japanese Campaigns in Chinese War
 Chinchow Operation
 Manchukuoan Anti Bandit Operations
 Operation Nekka
 Peiking–Hankou Railway Operation
 Tientsin–Pukow Railway Operation
 Operation Quhar
 Kuolichi-Taierhchuang Operation
 Canton Operation
 Amoy Operation
 Hainan Island Operation
 Han River Operation
 Invasion of French Indochina
 Swatow Operation
 Proposed Japanese invasion of Sichuan
 CHE-KIANG Operation
 Kwangchow Wan occupation
 Operation Ichi-Go

Battles in Burma Campaign
 Battle of Oktwin Mar. 20 - 23, 1942
 Battle of Toungoo Mar. 24-28, 1942
 Battle of Yedahe Apr. 5-8, 1942
 Battle of Szuwa River Apr. 10-16, 1942
 Battle of Pyinmana April 17–20, 1942
 Battle of Yenangyaung Apr. 17-19 1942
 Battle of Mawache and Yato Early April 1942 
 Battle of Bawlake April 17, 1942
 Battle of Hopong - Taunggyi April 20–24, 1942
 Battle of Loliem April 25, 1942
 Battle of Lashio (1942) April 29, 1942
 Battle of Hsenwe May 1, 1942
 Battle of Salween River May 6–31, 1942
 Battle of Hsipaw-Mogok Highway May 23, 1942
 Battle of Yupang Oct. - Dec. 1943
 Battle of Lashio Jan 1944
 Battle of Maingkwan Feb.- 5 Mar. 1944
 Battle of Mogaung Mar. 1944
 Battle of Myitkyina Apr. - Aug. 1944
 Battle of Mongyu Dec.1944 - Jan. 1945
 Battle of Lashio (1945) Mar. 1945
 Battle of Hsipaw Mar.1945

References 

Battles of the Second Sino-Japanese War